James Harold Kirkup, FRSL (23 April 1918 – 10 May 2009) was an English poet, translator and travel writer. He wrote over 45 books, including autobiographies, novels and plays. He wrote under many pen-names including James Falconer, Aditya Jha, Jun Honda, Andrew James, Taeko Kawai, Felix Liston, Edward Raeburn, and Ivy B. Summerforest. He became a Fellow of the Royal Society of Literature in 1962.

Early life  
James Kirkup was brought up in South Shields, educated at Westoe Secondary School, and then at King's College, Durham University. During the Second World War he was a conscientious objector, and worked for the Forestry Commission, on the land in the Yorkshire Dales and at the Lansbury Gate Farm, Clavering, Essex. He taught at The Downs School in Colwall, Malvern, where W. H. Auden had earlier been a master. Kirkup wrote his first book of poetry there; this was The Drowned Sailor, which was published in 1947. From 1950 to 1952, he was the first Gregory Poetry Fellow at Leeds University, making him the first resident university poet in the United Kingdom.

He moved south with his partner to Gloucestershire in 1952, and became a visiting poet at Bath Academy of Art for the next three years. Moving on from Bath, Kirkup taught in a London grammar school before leaving England in 1956 to live and work in continental Europe, the Americas and the Far East. In Japan, he found acceptance and appreciation of his work, and he settled there for 30 years, lecturing in English literature at several universities.

Blasphemy case
Kirkup came to public attention in 1977, after the newspaper Gay News published his poem "The Love That Dares to Speak Its Name", in which a Roman centurion describes his lust for and attraction to the crucified Jesus. In the Whitehouse v Lemon case, Mary Whitehouse, then Secretary of the National Viewers' and Listeners' Association, successfully prosecuted the editor of the newspaper, Dennis Lemon, for blasphemous libel under the Blasphemy Act 1697.

Poetry
After the writing of simple verses and rhymes from the age of six, and the publication of The Drowned Sailor in 1947, Kirkup's published works encompassed several dozen collections of poetry, six volumes of autobiography, over a hundred monographs of original work and translations and thousands of shorter pieces in journals and periodicals.  His skilled writing of haiku and tanka is acknowledged internationally. Many of his poems recall his childhood days in the north-east, and are featured in such publications as The Sense of the Visit, To the Ancestral North, Throwback, and Shields Sketches.

In 1995, James Hogg and Wolfgang Görtschacher (University of Salzburg Press / Poetry Salzburg) received a letter from Andorra signed by Kirkup, who had just returned from Japan. Kirkup suggested the republication of some of his early books that had been out of print for quite a while. At the same time he wanted to offer new manuscripts that would establish the Salzburg imprint as his principal publisher. What started in 1995 with the collection Strange Attractors and A Certain State of Mind – the latter an anthology of classic, modern and contemporary Japanese haiku – ended after more than a dozen publications with the epic poem Pikadon in 1997.

His home town of South Shields now holds a growing collection of his works in the Central Library, and artefacts from his time in Japan are housed in the nearby Museum. His last volume of poetry was published during the summer of 2008 by Red Squirrel Press, and was launched at a special event at Central Library in South Shields.

Bibliography

Poetry

The Drowned Sailor (1947)
The Submerged Village and Other Poems (1951)
A Correct Compassion and Other Poems (1952)
A Spring Journey and Other Poems 1952–1953 (1954)
The Descent into the Cave and Other Poems (1957)
The Prodigal Son, Poems 1956 – 1959 (1959)
Refusal to Confirm Last and First Poems (1963)
No Men Are Foreign (1966) (though was composed in 1966 but was the first in his collections of poetry)
The Caged Bird in Springtime (1967)
White Shadows, Black Shadows: Poems of Peace & War (1970)
The Body Servant: Poems of Exile (1971)
A Bewick Bestiary (1971; 2009)
The Sand Artist (1978)
The Haunted Lift (1982)
The Lonely Scarecrow (1983)
To the Ancestral North: Poems for an Autobiography (1983)
The Sense of the Visit (1984)
The House at Night (1988)
Throwback: Poems towards an Autobiography (1988)
Strange Attractors (University of Salzburg / Poetry Salzburg 1995)
A Certain State of Mind – An Anthology of Classic, Modern and Contemporary Japanese Haiku in Translation with Essays and Reviews (University of Salzburg / Poetry Salzburg 1995)
Broad Daylight: Poems East and West (University of Salzburg / Poetry Salzburg 1996)
The Patient Obituarist (University of Salzburg / Poetry Salzburg 1996)
How to Cook Women (University of Salzburg / Poetry Salzburg 1996)
Tanka Tales (University of Salzburg / Poetry Salzburg 1996)
Collected Shorter Poems: Omens of Disaster (Vol. 1) and Once and for All (Vol. 2) (University of Salzburg / Poetry Salzburg 1996)
An Extended Breath (University of Salzburg / Poetry Salzburg 1996)
Burning Giraffes (University of Salzburg / Poetry Salzburg 1996)
Measures of Time (University of Salzburg / Poetry Salzburg 1996)
Pikadon: An Epic Poem (University of Salzburg / Poetry Salzburg 1997)
He Dreamed He was a Butterfly (1997)
Marsden Bay (2008)
Home Thoughts (2011)

Plays
True Mystery of the Nativity (first published 1956)
The Prince of Homburg (first published 1959)
The Physicists (first produced 1963, first published 1963)
The Meteor (first produced 1966, first published 1973)
Play Strindberg (first produced 1992)
Two German Drama Classics (Heinrich von Kleist: The Prince of Homburg; Johann Christoph Friedrich von Schiller: Don Carlos. Transl. James Kirkup. University of Salzburg / Poetry Salzburg, 1996)
True Misteries and A Chronicle Play of Peterborough Cathedral (1 vol. Transl. James Kirkup. University of Salzburg / Poetry Salzburg, 1996)

Autobiography
The Only Child: An Autobiography of Infancy (1957)
Sorrows, Passions and Alarms: An Autobiography of Childhood (1959)
What is English Poetry? (1968)
I, of All People: An Autobiography of Youth (1990)
A Poet Could Not But be Gay (1991)
Me All Over (1993)
A Child of the Tyne (incl. The Only Child: An Autobiography of Infancy and Sorrow, Passions and Alarms: An Autobiography of Childhood; University of Salzburg / Poetry Salzburg 1996)

Criticism
Diversions: A Celebration for James Kirkup on His Eight

Description and travel
These horned islands: a journal of Japan (1962)
Tokyo (1966)
Streets of Asia (1969)
Japan behind the Fan (1970)
Heaven, Hell and Hara-Kiri (1974)

Translation
"Michel the Giant - An African in Greenland*, by Tété-Michel Kpomassie. From French to English. (1983)

Kirkup held the Atlantic Award for Literature from the Rockefeller Foundation in 1950; he was elected a Fellow of the Royal Society of Literature in 1962; he won the Japan P.E.N. Club Prize for Poetry in 1965; and was awarded the Scott Moncrieff Prize for Translation in 1992. In the mid-1990s he won the Japanese Festival Foundation Prize for A Book of Tanka.

He died in Andorra on 10 May 2009.

Legacy
Kirkup's papers are held at Yale and South Shields.

References

External links

The James Kirkup Collection in South Shields www.thejameskirkupcollection.co.uk
BBC News story on the Gay News blasphemy trial
Article 12 May 2009 in The Journal, Newcastle 
University of Salzburg Press (now Poetry Salzburg), Kirkup's major publisher in the mid-1990s
 James Kirkup – Daily Telegraph obituary
James Kirkup – Times Obituary
Obituary by Richard Canning and James Fergusson in The Independent
James Kirkup Papers. General Collection, Beinecke Rare Book and Manuscript Library, Yale University. 
 Archival material at 

1918 births
2009 deaths
British conscientious objectors
English-language haiku poets
Fellows of the Royal Society of Literature
English LGBT poets
Bisexual men
British bisexual writers
English male poets
20th-century English poets
English male journalists
English translators
German–English translators
English male dramatists and playwrights
People from South Shields
Writers from Tyne and Wear
20th-century English male writers
20th-century British translators
Alumni of King's College, Newcastle
LGBT academics
20th-century LGBT people